Amame (Love Me) may refer to:
Amame, 1988 album by La Mafia
Amame (album), 1989 album by El Gran Combo de Puerto Rico
"Amame" (song), 1993 song by Selena
"Ámame", a 2003 song by Alexandre Pires